The 1959–60 Copa México was the 43rd edition of the Copa México and the 17th staging in the professional era.

The competition started on March 6, 1960, and concluded on April 17, 1960, with the Final, held at the Estadio Olímpico Universitario in Mexico City, in which Necaxa defeated Tampico Madero 4–1.

First round

|}

Final round

Final

References

Copa MX
1959–60 in Mexican football
1959–60 domestic association football cups